Hettie Gray Baker (July 12, 1880 – November 14, 1957) was an American film editor.

Biography 
Born in Hartford, Connecticut, the daughter of Josiah Q. Baker and his wife Lizzie A. Chipman, Hettie attended public high school in Hartford before undertaking a special course of study at Simmons College in Boston. She was employed at the Hartford Public Library during 1900–03, where she began writing movie scenarios during her spare moments. She sold her first story, titled, Treasure Trove, to Vitagraph Studios. for $20, and continued to write and sell freelance works for the next six years. In 1903, she became a private secretary for the School for Social Workers in Boston, where she worked until 1907 when she was hired as a librarian for the Hartford Bar Library, a small law library.

In 1913, she was employed by Hobart Bosworth's film company as a story editor. Her work included scenario writing and scripting stories for a series of silent films based upon the work of Jack London. These included Burning Daylight (1914), The Valley of the Moon (1914), and The Chechako (1914). In February 1914, she was one of the co-founders of the Photoplay Authors League – a precursor of the Screen Writers Guild – and during the first year of operation was elected vice president and a member of the board of control.

In 1916, she went to work for Fox Film Corporation (later renamed Twentieth Century Fox) as a film editor. During her first year, she edited A Daughter of the Gods, Hollywood's first film with a million dollar budget, and, listed as H.G. Baker, may have been the first female editor to be acknowledged in a film's credits. She was the editor for Queen of the Sea (1918) starring Annette Kellerman, and The Iron Horse (1924), directed by John Ford. In total, she was a writer and editor for over 20 films, but was rarely credited.

By 1938, Hettie was a movie executive, serving as censor representative for Twentieth Century Fox. Being a cat-lover, later in her life she wrote several books about cats.

Bibliography
 Canting bookplates, 1926
 Cating bookplates, 1926
 Motion picture bookplates, 1930
 Bookplates of Hettie Gray Baker, 1947
 Your Siamese cat, 1951
 195 cat tales, 1953

References

External links

 
 
 Hettie Gray Baker at Women Film Pioneers Project

1880 births
1957 deaths
American film editors
American women film editors
Artists from Hartford, Connecticut
Women film pioneers
Simmons University alumni